The Doctrine of Tenrikyo is the doctrine of the Tenrikyo religion, published and sanctioned by Tenrikyo Church Headquarters. The Doctrine of Tenrikyo is one of the supplemental texts of the Tenrikyo scriptures, along with The Life of Oyasama and Anecdotes of Oyasama.

History

Meiji doctrine

In May 1903, Tenrikyo Church Headquarters created a doctrine of the Tenrikyo teachings, referred to as the "Meiji doctrine" or the "former doctrine" to distinguish it from the doctrine published after World War II. The doctrine's compilation was part of the church's effort to become an independent Shinto sect at the turn of the century, which would be achieved a few years later in 1908. Because the doctrine had to be authorized by the Shinto Main Bureau, an official government body, the Tenrikyo teachings presented therein conformed to State Shinto ideology, which promoted patriotism and reverence for the emperor. The Meiji Doctrine was divided into ten chapters – 'Revering God,' 'Respecting the Emperor,' 'Loving the Nation,' 'Morality,' 'Accumulating Virtues,' 'Cleansing of Impurities,' 'Founding of the Teachings,' 'Repayment to God,' 'The Kagura', and 'Peace of Mind.' Tenrikyo Church Headquarters compiled the doctrine with the collaboration of scholars Nakanishi Ushirō, Inoue Yorikuni, and Henmi Nakasaburō, who were specialists in religion, kokugaku, and Japanese classics respectively.

In the first half of the twentieth century, the Meiji doctrine was used in the schools of Tenrikyo's education system, such as Tenri Seminary. In 1912, two texts related to this doctrine, a commentary and a reference text, were published.

Restoration
After World War II and the assurance of religious freedom under the 1947 Constitution of Japan, a new doctrine based solely on Nakayama Miki's teachings was compiled. This doctrine was originally published by Tenrikyo Church Headquarters as Tenrikyo Kyoten on October 26, 1949, with the authorization of Nakayama Shozen, the Second Shinbashira. Since then, the Tenrikyo Kyoten has undergone one revision in 1984.

The first English edition of The Doctrine of Tenrikyo was published in 1954. The current edition is the tenth edition, published in 1993.

Content
The current Doctrine of Tenrikyo is primarily based on Tenrikyo's three scriptures, the Ofudesaki, Mikagura-uta, and the Osashizu. Other sources include an early biography of Nakayama Miki by her grandson Nakayama Shinnosuke, Shinnosuke's notes on Miki's teachings, and writings of those who heard Miki's teachings directly. Specifically regarding the Service, the Doctrine of Tenrikyo refers to Hitokotohanashi Dai San Kan, and regarding Tenri-O-no-Mikoto, the Doctrine of Tenrikyo refers to A Study on "God," "Tsukihi," and "Parent".

The outline of the Doctrine of Tenrikyo is as follows:

Part One
Chapter One: Oyasama
Chapter Two: The Path of Single-hearted Salvation
Chapter Three: The Truth of Origin
Chapter Four: Tenri-O-no-Mikoto
Chapter Five: The Divine Model
Part Two
Chapter Six: Divine Guidance
Chapter Seven: A Thing Lent, A Thing Borrowed
Chapter Eight: On The Way to the Final Goal
Chapter Nine: The Yoboku
Chapter Ten: The Joyous Life

References

Citations

Bibliography
 
 
  
 

Tenrikyo